This is a list of works that enter the public domain in part of the world in 2013.

Entering the public domain in Europe 
A work enters the public domain in most European countries (with the exception of Belarus) 70 years after the creator's death, if it was published during the author's lifetime.

Authors 
Robert Musil
Stefan Zweig
Neel Doff
Tatu Vaaskivi
Artturi Järviluoma
Bruno Schulz
Edwin Vincent Odle
Anthony M. Rud
Frank L. Packard
Terézia Vansová
Ernest Bramah
Violet Hunt
Peadar Toner Mac Fhionnlaoich
Lucy Maud Montgomery

Scholars and journalists 
 Léon Daudet
 Edith Stein
 Franz Boas
 Peadar Toner Mac Fhionnlaoich
 Bronislaw Malinowski
 Janusz Korczak
 William Pierpont Black
 Ludvig Lubbe Nordström
 Francis Younghusband
 A. E. Waite

Music 
 Francis Bousquet
 Wilhelm Peterson-Berger
 Jean Gilbert
 "Love Me Do", by The Beatles

Art 
 Walter Sickert
 Ramon Casas i Carbó
 Eric Ravilious
 Grant Wood

Brazil
Xavier Marques

Entering the public domain in the United States 

The Copyright Term Extension Act means no new works would enter the public domain in this jurisdiction until 2019.

See also
 1942 in literature, 1952 in literature, 1962 in literature and 1972 in literature
 2012 in public domain
 2014 in public domain
 2015 in public domain
 2016 in public domain
 2017 in public domain
 2018 in public domain
 2019 in public domain
 2020 in public domain
 2021 in public domain
 2022 in public domain
 List of countries' copyright lengths
 Public Domain Day
 Creative Commons
 Public Domain
 Over 300 public domain authors available in Wikisource (any language), with descriptions from Wikidata

External links 
 Public Domain Day's list of authors entering the public domain in 2013
 Center for the Study of the Public Domain's Public Domain Day 2013
 Public Domain Review Class of 2013

References 

Public domain
Public domain